Robert David Lawson,  (born 15 August 1944) was an Australian politician from 1993 to 2010 as a Liberal Party member of the South Australian Legislative Council.

Prior to entering politics, Lawson was appointed Queen's Counsel.

He held many positions in Liberal governments, such as Parliamentary Secretary for Information Technology, Presiding Member of Legislative Review Committee, Minister for the Ageing, Minister for Disability Services, Minister for Administrative Services, Minister for Information Services, Minister for Administrative and Information Services, Minister for Workplace Relations, Consumer Affairs, and briefly, 45th Attorney-General of South Australia. He has also held many positions in the Shadow Ministry, as well as Deputy Leader of the Opposition in the Legislative Council.

Lawson retired at the 2010 state election.

References

External links
 
 

1944 births
Attorneys-General of South Australia
Australian King's Counsel
Liberal Party of Australia members of the Parliament of South Australia
Living people
Members of the South Australian Legislative Council
Royal Australian Air Force officers
University of Adelaide alumni
21st-century Australian politicians